Blankenbach is a community in the Aschaffenburg district in the Regierungsbezirk of Lower Franconia (Unterfranken) in Bavaria, Germany, and a member of the Verwaltungsgemeinschaft (Administrative Community) of Schöllkrippen.

Geography

Location

The community lies some 17 km from Aschaffenburg and Alzenau. Together with the communities of Kleinkahl, Krombach, Schöllkrippen, Sommerkahl, Westerngrund and Wiesen, Blankenbach forms the Verwaltungsgemeinschaft (Administrative Community) of Schöllkrippen in the Kahlgrund.

History

Amalgamations
In 1966, the two communities of Großblankenbach and Kleinblankenbach, which lay on the Kahl's right and left banks respectively, merged into the community of Blankenbach. While Großblankenbach had formerly belonged to the Counts of Schönborn, Kleinblankenbach had been an Electoral Mainz holding.

Politics

Community council

The council is made up of 12 council members, not counting the mayor.

(as at municipal election held on 2 March 2008)

Coat of arms
The community's arms might be described thus: Gules a bar wavy argent, in chief a wheel spoked of six of the second, in base a lion passant queue fourchée Or standing on an abased partition per fess dancetty of three below which argent.

The community of Blankenbach came into being in 1966 through the merger of the formerly self-administering communities of Großblankenbach and Kleinblankenbach. The Kahl split these two communities, as symbolized by the wavy bar in the arms. Until the 19th century, the river formed the border between two lordly entities, with Großblankenbach being ruled by the Counts of Schönborn. This is shown in the arms by the lion, taken from the arms once borne by the Schönborn family, who governed the community for the Archbishopric of Würzburg, symbolized in the arms by the dancetty (that is, zigzag) partition in the base of the escutcheon, based on a similar partition in the arms borne by the bishops, and known as the “Franconian rake”. The six-spoked wheel (the Wheel of Mainz) refers to Electoral Mainz's lordship over Kleinblankenbach.

The arms have been borne since 1967.

Culture

Culinary specialities
Wine pressers in the community and Apfelwein from Blankenbach are known well beyond the Kahlgrund and look back on a long tradition.

Economy and infrastructure
For the lime kiln that was built after 1900 on the Kahlgrundbahn railway line, the raw material was brought by a cableway from the limestone pits at Sommerkahl and Eichenberg.

References

Aschaffenburg (district)